Balanda may refer to:

Places
Kalininsk, a town in Kalininsky District of Saratov Oblast, Russia, named Balanda until 1962
Balanda River in Russia, a tributary of the Medveditsa

People
Balanda Boor people, an ethnic group in South Sudan
Balanda Bviri people, an ethnic group in South Sudan
Pierre Bertran de Balanda (1887–1946), French Olympic horse rider

Other uses 
Balanda, an English word of Malay origin meaning a white person or European, used by Yolngu people in Northern Australia
Balanda, another term for the native vinta boat of the Philippines